Gstaad is a town in the German-speaking section of the Canton of Bern in southwestern Switzerland. It is part of the municipality of Saanen and is known as a major ski resort and a popular destination amongst high society and the international jet set. The winter campus of the Institut Le Rosey is located in Gstaad.

History

During the Middle Ages it was part of the district of Saanen (Gessenay) belonging to the Savoyard county of Gruyère.  The town core developed at the fork in the trails into the Valais and Vaud.  It had an inn, a warehouse for storing trade goods and oxen to help pull wagons over the alpine passes by the 13th-14th centuries.  The St. Nicholas chapel was built in the town in 1402, while the murals are from the second half of the 15th century.  The town was dominated by cattle farming and agriculture until the great fire of 1898.  It was then rebuilt to support the growing tourism industry.  The construction of the Montreux-Oberland Bernois railroad in 1905 and the construction of ski runs (the Ski Club of Saanen open in 1905 followed in 1907 by the Ski Club of Gstaad).  The first ski school in Gstaad opened in 1923.  The Eagle Ski Club opened in 1957, and was funded by Charles Greville, 7th Earl of Warwick. In a short time, there were more than 1,000 hotel beds in the region.

The residents, hoteliers, shopkeepers and tourist offices helped to promote Gstaad to international attention.  They supported the construction of ice rinks, tennis courts, swimming pools, ski jumps, and ski and hiking areas.  The first ski lifts at Funi opened in 1934-44 and were followed by a number of gondolas, ski, and chair lifts.  The Gstaad Palace opened in 1913 as Gstaad's first luxury hotel.  In 1942 the Saanen-Gstaad airfield was opened for military and civil aviation.  Helicopter rides were added later and in 1980 balloon flights became available as well.  During the World Wars and the Great Depression, the tourism industry suffered and many hotels closed.  After World War II, many of the large hotels remained closed, but they were replaced with a number of smaller non-hotel accommodation (chalets, apartment houses, residences).  Most of the modern resorts and small hotels are built out of wood and retain traditional design elements.

The Gstaad Polo Club was founded in 1992, and the Gstaad Yacht Club in 1998.

Climate
According to the Köppen climate classification system, Gstaad has a humid continental climate, abbreviated Dfb on climate maps.

Tourism

Situated in the Berner Oberland, Gstaad is home to a large ski area in the Alps ( of slopes). The middle of the village features a picturesque promenade bounded by numerous shops, restaurants, art galleries, and hotels.  Designer labels including Louis Vuitton, Hermès, Chopard, Brunello Cucinelli, Prada, Moncler, Ralph Lauren, and Cartier all have stores in Gstaad, while many smaller boutiques stock labels such as Chloe, Dolce & Gabbana, Tod's, Burberry, Dior, Oscar de la Renta, and Marc Jacobs.

Long known for its walking and hiking trails of varying degrees of difficulty, the mountain air and ambiance attract guests year-round from around the world. Gstaad is also known for its ski and cross-country slopes and winter hiking trails.

Gstaad, named "The Place" by Time magazine in the 1960s, is widely known for its famous part-time residents and vacationers. Famous regular visitors to Gstaad have included Madonna, Prince Charles and Princess Diana, former UN Secretary-General Kofi Annan, haute couture designer Valentino Garavani, writer William F. Buckley, Jr., and various members of the Cavendish family. Many British bands and musicians would play at L'Atelier, a club in Gstaad, in the 1960s and 1970s; one such band was Merlin 'Q' (later Edison Lighthouse), who stayed a whole winter.

Hotels
Gstaad is known for its luxury hotels, among them the Grand Hotel Park, the Alpina Gstaad, the Gstaad Palace, the Grand Hotel Bellevue, the Hotel Olden, and the Arc En Ciel. In July 2019, the Arc En Ciel came under fire for discrimination and later apologized after issuing a notice of rules directly addressed to its Indian guests.

Regular events

In Gstaad, the following regular events are held:

 the New Year Music Festival of Gstaad, held by the Princess Caroline Murat
 the Sommets Musicaux de Gstaad classical music winter series
 the Snow Bike Festival, a winter snow biking event
 the FIVB Beach Volleyball SWATCH World Tour - 1to1 energy Grand Slam, beach volleyball tournament
 the Swiss Open, tennis tournament
 the Ladies Championship Gstaad, tennis tournament 
 the Menuhin Festival Gstaad, classical music 
 the Hublot Polo Gold Cup, polo tournament
 the Country Night Gstaad
 the Gstaad Promenade Party in September
 the Christmas Market Circus in December
 the International Week - Hot Air Ballooning in January
 the Gstaad Mountain Rides Open in January

Education
Several boarding schools are located in or have a campus in Gstaad:
 Institut Le Rosey
 John F. Kennedy International School
 Gstaad International School, formerly in Gstaad, closed in June, 2014. It is scheduled to be redeveloped into an all-boys' school, Surval Gstaad.

Notable residents

 Current and former residents of Gstaad include: 
Royalty
 Grace Kelly (1929–1982), American film actress and Princess of Monaco
 Mohammad Reza Pahlavi (1919–1980), the last Shah of Iran
 Prince Rainier (1923–2005), Prince of Monaco

The Arts
 Balthus (1908–2001), Polish-French modern artist
Olivier Berggruen (born 1963), German-American art historian and curator.
 William F. Buckley Jr. (1925-2008), American conservative commentator, author and columnist.
 Friedrich Christian Flick (born 1944), German-Swiss art collector
 Andrew Grima (1921–2007), Anglo-Italian designer and doyen of modern jewelry design in Britain
 Johnny Hallyday (1943–2017), French rock and roll and pop singer.
 Maja Hoffmann (born 1956), art collector & founder of the LUMA Foundation.
 Yehudi Menuhin (1916–1999), American-born violinist and conductor
 Richard Scarry (1919–1994), American children's author and illustrator
 Justin Thannhauser (1892–1976), German art dealer, disseminated Modern art in Europe
 Taki Theodoracopulos (born 1936), a Greek journalist, writer and columnist.
 Madonna (born 1958), American pop singer.

Acting
 Dame Julie Andrews (born 1935), English actress, singer and author. 
 Blake Edwards (1922–2010), film director.
 Sir Roger Moore (1927–2017), actor.
 Jeanne Moreau (1928–2017), French actress, singer, screenwriter and director.
 Roman Polanski (born 1933), French-Polish film director, producer, writer and actor.
 Jane Randolph (1914–2009), American film actress.
 Peter Sellers (1925–1980), English film actor, comedian and singer.
 Dame Elizabeth Taylor (1932–2011), British-American actress.
Business
 Ernesto Bertarelli (born 1965), Italian-born Swiss billionaire businessman and philanthropist
 Philipp Braunwalder, Swiss businessman and philanthropist
 Bernie Ecclestone (born 1930), British Formula One business magnate.
 Curt Engelhorn (1926–2016), German billionaire, heir of the chemical company BASF
 Jean Claude Mimran (born 1945) businessman, the majority owner of the hotel Alpina Gstaad  
 Mortimer and Jacqueline Sackler, American heirs of Purdue Pharma makers of the opioid OxyContin.
 George Soros (born 1930), Jewish-Hungarian banker and activist

Popular culture
 Gstaad is one of the locations featured in F. Scott Fitzgerald's novel Tender Is the Night (1934).
 "Swiss Miss", the second-season premiere of the American animated television series Archer, takes place in Gstaad.
Season 4 Episode 8 of the TV Chuck has Chuck in Gstaad with a unique spy in order to try to recover the Intersect.
 Richard Scarry had a studio in Gstaad where he drew many of his books. 
 Philosopher Jiddu Krishnamurti was an occasional visitor to Gstaad; he included the experiences of his 1961 visit in his diary Krishnamurti's Notebook.
 Some scenes of Blake Edwards's movie The Return of the Pink Panther with Peter Sellers were filmed in Gstaad.
 Many Bollywood movies in mid 90s till 2000s have been shot in the town.
 Dan Aykroyd famously said to Bo Diddley in the movie, "Trading Places", "This is a Rochefoucauld,” he says, “the thinnest water-resistant watch in the world. Singularly unique, sculptured in design, hand-crafted in Switzerland, and water resistant to three atmospheres. This is the sports watch of the 1980s. Six thousand, nine hundred and fifty-five dollars retail! It tells time simultaneously in Monte Carlo, Beverly Hills, London, Paris, Rome, and Gstaad!"
 In Season 5, Episode 9 of New Girl, Schmidt and Winston get into an argument about which one of them have actually been to Gstaad. Regan (played by Meghan Fox) interjects and tells them to tell the truth about whether either of them have actually ever been to Gstaad. Feeling insecure, Winston presses Regan about whether she has been to Gstaad and she responds by saying "No I haven't been there. Should I be ashamed of that or can we all just tell the truth about whether we've been to "Shtaad."
 "Gstaad Guy", an internet personality, parodies the nouveau riche and old money residents of Gstaad.
 In Frasier episode "Murder Most Maris", Niles encounters a photo of himself and socialite divorced wife Maris in front of the fictional Experimental Liposuction Center in Gstaad. He sighs that was where they got married.

References

External links

 – official site (in English, French, & German)
GstaadLife magazine (in English, with links to German sister publication, the "Anzeiger von Saanen")

Ski areas and resorts in Switzerland
Villages in the canton of Bern